Nicotinamide mononucleotide adenylyltransferase 2 (NMNAT2) is an enzyme that in humans is encoded by the NMNAT2 gene.

This gene product belongs to the nicotinamide-nucleotide adenylyltransferase (NMNAT) enzyme family, members of which catalyze an essential step in the nicotinamide adenine dinucleotide (NAD+ (NADP)) biosynthetic pathway. NMNAT2 is cytoplasmic (associated with the Golgi apparatus), and is predominantly expressed in the brain. Two transcript variants encoding different isoforms have been found for this gene.

Loss of NMNAT2 initiates Wallerian degeneration. By contrast, NMNAT2 enhancement opposes the actions of SARM1 which would lead to axon degeneration, but this effect is not due to preventing SARM1 depletion of NAD+.  Mice lacking NMNAT2 die before birth, but are completely rescued by SARM1 deletion. Activation of NMNAT2 by Sirtuin 3 (SIRT3) may be a means of inhibiting axon degeneration and dysfunction.

The catechin epigallocatechin gallate (EGCG) found in tea  can activate NMNAT2 by more than 100%.

References

Further reading